Gibson may refer to:

Businesses
 Gibson Brands, Inc., an American manufacturer of guitars, other musical instruments, and audio equipment
 Gibson Technology, and English automotive and motorsport company based
 Gibson Appliance, a former American refrigerator manufacturer
 Gibson Greetings, an American greeting cards brand
 Gibson's Discount Center, a former American discount store chain
 Gibson Manufacturing Corporation, a former American tractor and railroad speeder manufacturer

People
 Gibson (surname)
 Gibson (Kent cricketer) (fl. 1780)
 Gibson baronets

Places

Australia
 Gibson, Western Australia, village
 Gibson Desert, Western Australia

Canada
 Gibson, Ontario
 Gibsons, town in British Columbia

United States
 Gibson, Arkansas
 Gibson, Georgia
 Gibson, Iowa
 Gibson, Louisiana
 Gibson, Mississippi
 Gibson, Dunklin County, Missouri
 Gibson, Pemiscot County, Missouri
 Gibson, New York
 Gibson, North Carolina
 Gibson, Oklahoma
 Gibson, Pennsylvania
 Gibson, Tennessee
 Gibson, Wisconsin
 Gibson Amphitheatre, a former indoor amphitheatre in Los Angeles, California, US

Other uses
 Gibson (cocktail)
 Gibson (dog)
 "Gibson" (short story), an award-winning story by Brenda Damen
 Gibson (SRMTHFG), a character in Super Robot Monkey Team Hyperforce Go!
 Gibson's paradox, an economics observation regarding interest rates and price levels 
 Gibson, a style of English clog

See also
 Gibson County (disambiguation)
 Gibson Hall (disambiguation)
 Gibson House (disambiguation)
 Gibson Island (disambiguation)
 Gibson Lake (disambiguation)
 Gibson Theatre (disambiguation)
 Gibson Township (disambiguation)
 Justice Gibson (disambiguation)
 Senator Gibson (disambiguation)
 
 Gibsonia (disambiguation)